"Izzo (H.O.V.A.)" (often referred to as "H to the Izzo") is the first single released by Jay-Z from his sixth album The Blueprint. It is among his most popular singles. This was the second song released off The Blueprint, after the diss track "Takeover", but the lead single from it. The song reached number eight on the Billboard Hot 100 in the US. It was Jay-Z's first top 10 single as a lead artist.

The song, produced by Kanye West, prominently features a sample of "I Want You Back" by The Jackson 5, the second major hit in 2001 to sample that song (after "My Baby" by Lil' Romeo).

Jay-Z premiered the song live at the inaugural BET Awards on June 19, 2001.

The song was later mashed up with Linkin Park's "In the End" for their collaborative EP, Collision Course.

Meaning
Izzo and H.O.V.A are synonymous with Jehovah. Jay-Z earned the nickname "Jay-Hova" due to his songwriting skills.

"They start calling me Jay-Hova. I didn’t want to offend people, by saying I was Jehovah. I’m God or anything like that. I know way better than that." -Jay-Z

Copyright infringement lawsuit
On October 31, 2001, a copyright lawsuit was filed against Jay-Z by Demme Ulloa, who claimed that she was wasn't paid for her contribution to "Izzo". Ulloa asserted that it was her singing "H to the izzo/V to the izzay", though she didn't receive any money for her contribution and was not credited in the liner notes of The Blueprint. The joint authorship claim was dismissed in 2004 but continued to proceed for a copyright infringement claim, which was ultimately settled.

Credits and personnel
The credits for "Izzo (H.O.V.A.)" are adapted from the liner notes of The Blueprint.
Studio locations
 Mastered at Masterdisk, New York City, New York.
 Mixed at Right Track Studios, New York City, New York.
 Recorded at Baseline Studios, New York City, New York.

Personnel
 Jay-Z – songwriting, vocals
 Kanye West – production, songwriting
 Berry Gordy – songwriting
 Alphonso Mizell – songwriting
 Freddie Perren – songwriting
 Deke Richards – songwriting
 Young Guru – recording
 Kamel Adbo – recording
 Ken "Duro" Ifill – mixing
 Tony Dawsey – mastering

Samples
 "Izzo (H.O.V.A.)" contains elements of "I Want You Back", as performed by The Jackson 5 and written by The Corporation (Berry Gordy, Alphonso Mizell, Freddie Perren and Deke Richards).

Charts

Weekly charts

Year-end charts

References

2001 singles
2001 songs
Def Jam Recordings singles
Jay-Z songs
Music videos directed by Dave Meyers (director)
Roc-A-Fella Records singles
Song recordings produced by Kanye West
Songs written by Jay-Z
Songs written by Berry Gordy
Songs written by Deke Richards
Songs written by Freddie Perren
Songs written by Kanye West